Ultimatum is a Canadian French language television game show, broadcast from 2001 to 2004 on the TVA network. The show, produced in Montreal, Quebec and is hosted by Yvan Ponton. Its visual style and lighting were largely inspired by the success of the British/American game show Who Wants to Be a Millionaire?. The rules of the game are, however, different.

Synopsis and basic rules

Standard game 
The game was played with five contestants, including a returning champion who was the first "controller". The controller picked a question category from a set list, then read the question and directed it to another contestant. If the contestant answered correctly, they became the new controller and the outgoing controller lost a "life". If the contestant answered incorrectly, the controller retained control and the contestant lost a life. Each contestant began the game with three lives, and if they were reduced to zero, were eliminated from the game.

However, each player also had access to a number of "tools" to encourage strategic play. Each tool could be invoked only once by each player over the course of the game. They were:
Ricochet, which could be used by a player who was asked to answer a question to redirect the question to any other contestant (except the controller) as if the controller had asked them directly.
Miroir (mirror), which could also be used by a player who was asked a question, but would instead direct the question back on the controller, reversing the roles.
Piege (trap), which was used by the controller. If a controller found a question they were sure they knew the answer to, they could "trap" another contestant of their choice, answer the question themselves, and, if correct, cost the trapped player a life. If wrong, the trapped player assumed control and the outgoing controller lost a life.

When any of these tools was invoked, or if the contestant had no tools left to use, the host would declare a question to be an "ultimatum", with more dramatic lighting and more tense background music was played.

After all contestants but one had been eliminated, the remaining contestant was declared the winner, and went on to play the bonus round. At one point during the series the contestant who won the game received .

Bonus round
The bonus round pitted the winner of the standard game against the collective brain power of the eliminated contestants, with a bit of a twist: for each life the winner had remaining at the end of the game, they could eliminate an opponent, meaning they would not be allowed to help the rest answer the question. In this fashion, if a winner had all three lives left, the bonus round would effectively be one-on-one.

Later in the run, the bonus round was altered; the contestant chose a category, and was read a question. They had 10 seconds to think and, if they answered correctly, won CA$1,000.

Tournament play
On several occasions during the run, a multi-week tournament would be held. The five contestants played every day from Monday through Friday, with the player who won the most money invited back for the finals. Then four additional weeks would be played each with five new contestants. When five finalists had been crowned, those finalists played an additional week against each other, with the winner of the finals receiving CA$40,000.

See also
List of Quebec television series
Television of Quebec
Culture of Quebec
Quiz show

2000s Canadian game shows
2001 Canadian television series debuts
2004 Canadian television series endings
Quiz shows
Television shows filmed in Montreal
TVA (Canadian TV network) original programming
Who Wants to Be a Millionaire?